Fleuré is a commune in the Orne department in north-western France.

See also
Communes of the Orne department
Château de la Motte, Joué du Plain

References

Communes of Orne